Sonohara Dam is a dam in the Gunma Prefecture of Japan.

Dams in Gunma Prefecture
Dams completed in 1965